Sofiane Bezzou (born May 8, 1981 in Rouen) is a French-born Algerian professional football player who is currently playing for US Quevilly in the Championnat National.

Career
A product of the PSG Academy, he left the club at age 19 when he was not offered a professional contract. He then joined Nîmes Olympique who were playing in Ligue 2 but made just two appearances for the club. He spent the next few seasons bouncing around in the amateur leagues with FUSC Bois-Guillaume and CMS Oissel. In the summer of 2007, he joined Pacy Vallée-d'Eure. In November 2010, he moved to Fréjus Saint-Raphaël.

International career
In 2002, Bezzou was called up to the Algerian Under-21 National Team.

External links
 Bezzou with Algerian U21 team
 LFP.fr Profile

1981 births
Living people
French footballers
Algerian footballers
French sportspeople of Algerian descent
Footballers from Rouen
Ligue 2 players
Nîmes Olympique players
Pacy Ménilles RC players
ÉFC Fréjus Saint-Raphaël players
US Quevilly-Rouen Métropole players
CMS Oissel players
Association football midfielders